Lecanocybe is a genus of fungus in the mushroom family Marasmiaceae. This is a monotypic genus, containing the single species Lecanocybe lateralis, found in Java and Hawaii.

See also
 List of Marasmiaceae genera

References

External links
 

Fungi of Asia
Fungi of North America
Marasmiaceae
Monotypic Agaricales genera